Mikhail Svetlov may refer to:

Mikhail Arkadyevich Svetlov, Russian/Soviet poet
Mikhail Svetlov (singer), Russian/American opera singer